Star Wars: The Essential Guide To Vehicles and Vessels is a book by Bill Smith published by Boxtree in 1995.

Contents
Star Wars: The Essential Guide To Vehicles and Vessels is details 100 vehicles and star-going craft to be seen and read about in the Star Wars movies, the graphic novels and the spin-off books.

Reception
Paul Pettengale reviewed Star Wars: The Essential Guide To Vehicles and Vessels for Arcane magazine, rating it a 4 out of 10 overall. Pettengale comments that "the casual Star Wars fan, and even die-hard enthusiasts will find little to further their knowledge of the Star Wars universe in this tome. Detailed it may be, but ultimately, it's stale and rather boring."

Reviews
Review by Don D'Ammassa (1996) in Science Fiction Chronicle, #190 October 1996 
Review by Andy Sawyer (1997) in Foundation, #69 Spring 1997

References

Books based on Star Wars